A Fight for Honor is a 1924 American silent action film directed by Henry MacRae and starring William Fairbanks, Eva Novak and Claire McDowell.

Cast
 William Fairbanks as Jack Adams
 Eva Novak as Margaret Hill
 Claire McDowell as Mrs. Hill
 Jack Byron as Walter Bradson
 Marion Harlan as Mary Hill
 Derry Welford as Gertie Gilson
 Wilfred Lucas as Tom Grady

References

Bibliography
 Robert B. Connelly. The Silents: Silent Feature Films, 1910-36, Volume 40, Issue 2. December Press, 1998.

External links
 

1924 films
1920s action films
American silent feature films
American action films
American black-and-white films
Columbia Pictures films
Films directed by Henry MacRae
1920s English-language films
1920s American films